Leo A. Soriano (born 10 December 1950) is a retired bishop of the United Methodist Church. He was elected in 2000 in the Philippines and held his position until 2012.

Early life
Soriano is the second son of Benjamin Soriano, a Methodist pastor, and Purificacion Aranda, a teacher. He has two brothers and a sister. He was born in Binalonan, Pangasinan, and spent his early childhood there. His family moved to Cagayan de Oro where he spent his teenage years. Growing up in Mindanao, he became an active member of the Methodist Youth Fellowship. His early involvement in church activities would later influence him to enroll in different college activities and organizations including the ROTC, Glee Club, and university organs. He finished his Bachelor of Science degree with flying colors. He instead went to Manila and studied in seminary. He met his wife while in seminary. They married in 1977 and have four children.

Medical missionary
He started his ministry after graduating cum laude and as president of his class from the Union Theological Seminary in the Philippines. While raising a family, Leo studied and earned a doctor of medicine degree from the Davao Medical School Foundation. He was appointed as Doctor in Mission for the Medical Mobile Clinic of the Mindanao Annual Conference. This position led him to work in the underserved and far-flung villages and mountains in the war-torn area of Mindanao and Visayas. He served as a missionary doctor from 1989 until the late 1990s. He reached out to the hundreds of ethnic groups and underserved communities in the provinces of Cotabato, Davao, Leyte, Samar, Sultan Kudarat, Zamboanga and even in Palawan. When Mt. Pinatubo erupted in 1992, he was there serving the ethnic groups (Aetas) of Zambales. He held that position until the project funded by the U.M. General Board of Global Ministries changed it to a Community-based Primary Health Care Program.

Episcopal ministry
Soriano was elected as Bishop on the 5th ballot during the 2000 Philippines Central Conference held in Cabanatuan, Philippines. The overwhelming support and his early election in the 5th Ballot was unprecedented in the history of the United Methodist Church in the Philippines. His election was an indication of the Filipino Methodists desire for change in their church politics. The personal background of Leo, having family roots from the North of the country yet living and representing the South, became a symbol of the desire of the Church to be all-inclusive and intentional in representing equally all ethnic groups of the country.

He served as the Resident Bishop of the Davao episcopal area, one of three episcopal areas of the Philippines, for 12 years (2000-2012).  His offices were in the Spottswood Methodist Center in Kidapawan City. In 2004 he was appointed to a four-year position as one of four voting members of the General Council on Finance and Administration of the United Methodist Church. He has served as a member of the UMC Council of Bishops, the UMC General Council on Ministries, and the cross denominational organizations Christian Conference of Asia and National Council of Churches in the Philippines.

 serves on the Philippine Christian University Board of Trustees.

He has acted as a spokesperson for UMC Philippines during the December 2003 typhoons and Southern Leyte mudslides and signing a Bible sent to President George W. Bush as congratulations following his re-election, a 200-year-old UMC tradition.

On November 24, 2008, Bishop Soriano was re-elected for a third term as Bishop of the United Methodist Church and was reassigned to Davao Episcopal Area.

Bishop Soriano retired from active service in December 2012 during the Philippine Central Conference of the UMC held in Bayombong, Nueva Vizcaya. As he was to retire during that conference, he delivered the Episcopal Address as was the tradition in the UMC. He was given a tribute and a retirement service during the said conference.

Post-Episcopacy
Bishop Soriano teaches at the Southern Philippines Methodist Colleges in Kidapawan, North Cotabato and the Bishop Han Theological Seminary in Bukidnon. He mentors aspiring pastors from different Christian traditions and denominations on practical ministry. Using his medical background and pastoral experience, he designed a special course with his son Nezer entitled Intro to Health Ministry that teaches young pastors and students about Wesley's emphasis on holistic ministry to the physical body, soul and the environment. Bishop Soriano also teaches Intro to Old Testament.

Advocacy
Bishop Soriano is one of the Filipino bishops that support an autonomous, affiliated relationship with the United Methodist Church. His election is an overwhelming indication of the desire of the Filipino Methodist to be led by leaders who will move the Filipino United Methodist Church a step closer to becoming autonomous. Bishop Soriano has been actively working at the grassroots level to listen to the voices of the local churches and hear their sentiments about autonomy, church growth, and other church issues.

Being the Bishop of Mindanao, Bishop Soriano has been advocating for a harmonious living relationship among Christians and Muslims. The Bishop's office of the Davao Episcopal Area has been actively involved in the Christian-Muslim Dialogue that seeks to find ways and means to achieve peace in Mindanao.

See also
List of bishops of the United Methodist Church

Notes

References
The United Methodist Newscope  Volume 32, No. 51/December 17, 2004 "United Methodists in the Philippines Move Toward Autonomy" Reports that Soriano was re-elected as bishop.
United Methodist Church, 12/21/2000 - Philippine United Methodists elect two new bishops
United Methodist News Service - Gunmen kill United Methodist local pastor in Philippines "United Methodist Bishop Leo A. Soriano, who leads the church’s Davao Area, condemned the killing and urged civil and military authorities to bring the guilty parties to justice."

External links
 Photo of Bishop Soriano

Filipino United Methodist bishops
1950 births
Living people
20th-century Filipino medical doctors
People from Davao City
Filipino Methodist bishops
Filipino Methodist missionaries
Methodist missionaries in the Philippines
People from Pangasinan
People from Cagayan de Oro
Christian medical missionaries